Adam Lowitt is an American standup comedian, a four-time Emmy-winning, 6 time nominated co-executive producer and supervising producer for the news satire program The Daily Show.  He performs regularly in New York and performed on Comedy Central as part of John Oliver's New York Stand-Up Show In 2012, Adam was selected to perform at the Just for Laughs Festival in Montreal as part of their New Faces Showcase. Adam often performs locally and has opened for other comedians he works with at The Daily Show. Starting December 2015, he is a contributor on The Daily Show. He was an Executive Producer on Sacha Baron Cohen's 2018 comedy series Who Is America?.

Awards

Personal life
Adam Lowitt went to Countryside High School in Clearwater, Florida and studied at the University of Florida. On September 13, 2014, Adam Lowitt married Becky Friedman. Becky is the head writer of Daniel Tiger's Neighborhood on PBS as well as a writer and editor for Out of the Blue Enterprises. Adam Lowitt lives in New York, New York with his wife.

References

American male comedians
21st-century American comedians
American television producers
Living people
University of Florida alumni
Primetime Emmy Award winners
Year of birth missing (living people)